The 2002 NCAA Division I Outdoor Track and Field Championships were contested at the 81st annual NCAA-sanctioned track meet to determine the individual and team champions of men's and women's Division I collegiate track and field in the United States.

This year's championships, the 21st event for both men and women, were held May 29–June 1, 2002 at the Bernie Moore Track Stadium at Louisiana State University in Baton Rouge, Louisiana. 

Hosts LSU won the men's title, the Tigers' fourth and first since 1990.

South Carolina won the women's title, the Gamecocks' first team championship.

Team results 
 Note: Top 10 only
 (H) = Hosts
Full results

Men's standings

Women's standings

References

NCAA Men's Outdoor Track and Field Championship
NCAA Division I Outdoor Track And Field Championships
NCAA Division I Outdoor Track And Field Championships
NCAA Division I Outdoor Track and Field Championships
NCAA Division I Outdoor Track and Field Championships
NCAA Women's Outdoor Track and Field Championship